In European mythology and literature since at least the 19th century, a cambion  is the offspring of an incubus, succubus, or other type of demon with a human. In the word’s earliest known uses, it was interchangable with changeling.

Changelings 
Cambion comes from the Late Latin cambiare 'to exchange,' and ultimately from the Celtic root "kamb", meaning crooked or exchange. In its earliest known uses, the word is used for a changeling, the child of fairies or demons who has been substituted for a human baby. William of Auvergne, in his 13th-century work De Universo, wrote of "cambiones, from cambiti, that is 'having been exchanged'"  - the "sons of incubi demons." These false infants constantly wail for milk and cannot be satisfied even by four nurses. Richard Firth Green notes that this "was to become the standard scholastic explanation for changelings throughout the Middle Ages."

The earliest evidenced appearance of the word "cambion" in the sense of an offspring of two demons is in the 1818 French-Language Dictionnaire Infernal. The 1825 edition of that book has the following entry:

English translation:

In the Encyclopedia of Occultism and Parapsychology the cambion is again said to be the direct offspring of the incubus and the succubus, foregoing any need for human involvement. This same incarnation retained the absence of breath or a pulse until seven years of age, but was said to also have been incredibly heavy (even too heavy for a horse to carry) and to have cried upon being touched.

Human-demon hybrids 
Since at least the 19th century, "cambion" has taken on a further definition: the child of an incubus or a succubus with a human parent. In 1874, Victor Hugo's Toilers of the Sea defined a cambion as the son of a woman and the devil. It also appeared as a hybrid of human and demon in Dungeons and Dragon's 1983 Monster Manual II.

The concept of offspring born to humans and demons was a subject of debate in the Middle Ages, but did not have a widely accepted name. The influential Malleus Maleficarum, which has been described as the major compendium of literature in demonology of the fifteenth century, states that demons, including the incubus and the succubus, are incapable of reproduction:

Because of this inability to create or nurture life, the method of the creation of a cambion is necessarily protracted. A succubus will have sexual relations with a human male and so acquire a sample of his sperm. This she will then pass on to an incubus, who then corrupts and strengthens the seed. The incubus will, in his turn, transfer this sperm to a human female and thus impregnate her.

The text goes on to discuss at great length the arguments for and against this process being possible, citing a number of Biblical quotations and noted scholars in support of its arguments, and finally concludes that this is indeed the method used by such demons. The Malleus Maleficarum refers to the children of incubi as "campsores" or "Wechselkind" (a German term for changelings).

In popular culture
 Modern writers have sometimes used the term cambion for Merlin, who in Arthurian legend is the son of a mortal woman and an incubus.
 The Dark Horse Comics character Hellboy is a cambion, being the offspring of the demon Azzael and a human woman, Sarah Hughes.
 Supernatural season 5 episode 6. Castiel explains what a Cambion is at 24 minutes into the episode. 
 The DC Comics character Raven is a cambion, being the offspring of her evil demonic father, Trigon, and a human woman, Arella.

See also
 Cambion (Dungeons & Dragons)
 Dhampir (a half-vampire)
 Grendel
 Nephilim (a half-angel)
 Robert the Devil
 Sir Gowther

References

Fantasy creatures
Mythological human hybrids
Medieval legends
Succubi
Devils